Chengara is a small village situated in the Pathanamthitta district in Kerala, India. It is known for its natural environment, hills and climate, and was found to have the cleanest air, in terms of concentration of dust particles. Chengara is surrounded on three sides by Harrisons Malayalam Limited, a rubber plantation company.

Climate 
The village has a tropical climate with three distinct seasons: a humid summer, monsoon, and a moderate winter. The warmest month is April. The village often experiences heavy thundershowers in May, during which humidity remains high. The monsoon season is from June to August with most of the heavy rainfall in June and July, June being the wettest month of the year.

Demographics 

Chengara has a population of just above 1,500. The literacy rate of the village is 99%.

Education 

G.C.S.L.P. school is the only school in Chengara. The school is owned by the Chengara Service Co-operative Society Ltd. It covers a standard of I-V. The nearest higher secondary school is St. George Vocational Higher Secondary School in Attachackal. Students from Chengara also go to schools in nearby towns, such as Pathanamthitta and Kozhencherry. Those who study technical courses attend the technical institutes around Pathanamthitta.

Economy 
The economy of Chengara is primarily based in agriculture. Rubber plantations are a major source of income for the local population. Chengara is among the largest rubber-producing places in Kerala, due to its hilly terrain, high humidity and rainfall.  Other major crops are cocoa, coconut, tapioca and pepper. Chengara has a large number of non-residents.

Politics 
Major political parties in Chengara are Indian National Congress (INC) and Communist Party of India (Marxist) (CPI [M]). K. U. Jenish Kumar (CPI [M]) is the present  of Konni which includes Chengara and Anto Antony is the present MP of Pathanamthitta constituency which includes Chengara..Chengara belongs to Konni gram panchayat (village council). The present panchayat member of Chengara is N. N. Rajappan of INC. Chengara Surendran MP (Communist Party of India) is also a native of Chengara. Chengara Surendran (born 31 January 1968) was a member of the 14th Lok Sabha of India. He represented the Adoor constituency of Kerala and is a member of the Communist Party of India (CPI).

Traditionally Chengara is a stronghold of INC. Kerala congress also has presence in the village. Abraham Vazhayil (District Secretary Kerala Congress (M), Chairman, UDF Konni Constituency) is also a native of Chengara. Though Chengara has a long tradition of politics, there has been no conflict among the different political parties.

Culture

Religion 
The people of Chengara belong to various religions, the major ones being Christianity and Hinduism. Churches in the village includes Bethel Marthoma Church, St George Orthodox Church Chengara ( Chengara Pally,  1979), St Patrick's Malankara Catholic Church, and Bethel Brethren Assembly and Pentecost Church (IPC). The Hindu temple in the village is Chengara Siva Parvathi Temple.

Bethel Marthoma Church organizes an annual Chengara Convention in January every year. Bethel Marthoma Church,Chengara belongs to the Ranni-Nilackal Diocese of Malankara Marthoma Syrian Church.

St. George Orthodox Church, Chengara (Chengara Pally or ചെങ്ങറ പള്ളി  ) is an ancient church located in Chengara , Pathanamthitta, Kerala , India. The Church Is Also Known as “ Chengara Pally. It is the headquarters of the Thumpamon Diocese of the Malankara Orthodox Syrian Church.

Feast of St George
The Feast of St. George, whom the church is named after and the patron saint of the church, is celebrated by St George Orthodox Church every year from May 1–5.

Sports 
Cricket is the most popular sport in the village. A cricket tournament is held annually during the mid-summer vacation. Other popular sports are football, volleyball and badminton.

Notable locations 
Orakuzhi is a small waterfall located at the Kizhakkupuram border of the village. This place is a common hangout for youths.

Meemooti Thodu is another waterfall in Chengara, which is dangerous due to its high fall over rock. The possibility of damming the stream was explored but deemed unfeasible.

Harrisons Malayalam Rubber Plantation covers a significant part of Chengara, stretching over. It is crossed with many unpaved service roads suitable for bullock or trucks.

Infrastructure

Communication 
Mobile services from many providers are available in the village. The major service providers are BSNL, Airtel, Idea, Vodafone and Jio. The village has a cable network which provides Malayalam channels and major channels in other languages.

Transportation 
Both Kerala State Road Transport Corporation (KSRTC) and private buses connect the Chengara with the nearby towns.

The Attachakal–Malayalapuzha road and Attachakal–Kumblampoika road pass through Chengara. From Konni this is the easiest route to places such as Vadaserikara and Ranni. The route can be used as Sabarimala route.

Chengara Junction is on the Attachakal–Chengara–Kumblampoika road, which connects the villages of Attachakkal, Chengara, Puthukulam and Kumplampoika. It originates at Attachakal junction and ends at Kumplampoika, and covers a total distance of 

Institutions 
Various institutions in Chengara are:
Chengara Service Co-operative Society
Chengara Pravasi Association
Chengara Post Office
Olive Mart supermarket
Ration shop chengara

Tribal agitations 

The village is frequently mentioned in the media due to a land struggle, popularly known as "Chengara Samaram", which took place on a rubber plantation  outside the village. Led by Laha Gopalan, the Sadu Jana Vimochana Samara Vedi (SJVSV) agitation began with hundreds of Vedi workers encroaching upon the Kumbazha Estate of Harrison Malayalam Limited on 4 August 2007, demanding  of land for farming and  towards initial farming expenses to each landless family among them. They pitched tents on the occupied land and started tapping the rubber trees at the estate for their livelihood. The Vedi leader claimed that  of land at Chengara were under SJVSV occupation.

During the agitation, notable persons including Medha Patkar, Arundhati Roy, Govindacharaya, and V. M. Sudheeran visited and extended solidarity with local families. However, the struggle created a negative image of Chengara. The previous LDF government had identified  of land in 10 districts for distribution among the 1,495 eligible landless people as part of the Chengara Package. Of the 1,495 families identified, 38 families belong to the Scheduled Tribes category and 1,227 to the Scheduled Castes. However, many people declined to occupy the land allotted to them, finding it unsuitable for habitation and farming. Vedi leader Laha Gopalan had categorically stated that there was no question of vacating the land until all the landless families at Chengara were allotted land suitable for farming and habitation. Some families have constructed permanent dwellings in the encroached land and started cultivation there. The Vedi too have set up a library and school on the occupied land.

See also 
 Malankara Orthodox Syrian Church
Bethel Marthoma Church
Pathanamthitta
Konni, India
Kumbazha

References

External links
 http://teamchengara.weebly.com/
 http://chengarapally.com/

Villages in Pathanamthitta district